Chirumarthi Lingaiah is an Indian politician. He was an MLA from Nakrekal assembly constituency in Nalgonda district, Telangana, India. He belongs to Indian National Congress.

Early life
He was born in Nalgonda district, TS, India in a scheduled caste, Madiga community. He studied at Osmania University.

Career
Chirumarthi Lingaiah won the SC reserved seat, Nakrekal constituency,  in 2009. He resigned in 2010 for Telangana cause but was not accepted. He again resigned in October 2011 along with Komatireddy Venkat Reddy. 

In the Assembly elections in 2018, he again contested on Indian National Congress ticket. He defeated Vemula Veeresham of Telangana Rashtra Samithi and later joined Telangana Rashtra Samithi.

References

Living people
Indian National Congress politicians
Andhra Pradesh MLAs 2009–2014
Telangana MLAs 2018–2023
Year of birth missing (living people)